Vitalina Nikolaevna Bibliv (born October 15, 1980, Vasilkov, Kyiv region, Ukrainian SSR) is a Ukrainian theater, film and television actress. Winner of the Golden Yula National Prize (2019), Honored Artist of Ukraine (2020).

Biography 
Vitalina Bibliv was born on October 15, 1980, in the city of Vasilkov, Kyiv region.

The school teacher Inna Pushkareva helped with the choice of the acting profession. On Teacher's Day in the ninth grade, Vitalina was instructed to make a parody of Verka Serduchka. Although she doubted, the teacher believed in her charisma.

After school, Vitalina studied at the School of Culture. In an interview, she notes that from school she dreamed of being a clown and working in a circus. By that time, a variety and circus education could only be obtained at a school, and Vitalina sought to get a higher education. In 2003 she graduated from the Kiev Theater Institute. Karpenko-Kary (workshop of Les Tanyuk).

In 2003-2004 she was an actress at the Kyiv Free Stage Theatre. From 2003 to 2008 she worked as an actress at the Kyiv theater "Atelier 16". Since 2008 - in the Kiev Academic Theater "Golden Gate", while collaborating with the Kyiv Academic Young Theater, the production agency "TE-ART". In 2015, Vitalina Bibliv became a theatrical discovery, playing the role of Glory in the play "Stalkers" by Stas Zhirkov.

The debut in the cinema took place in 2004 - a small role in the TV series "Blind Love" by Nikolai Kaftan. Critics pay special attention to the film  Song of Songs (2015 film) directed by Eva Neymann, where Vitalina played a Jewish mother. The tape was recognized as the best film in Europe (2012), the best film of the international and domestic competition of the 2015 Odesa International Film Festival.

In 2009, she was named one of the 20 best actresses in Ukraine.

She teaches at the Kyiv College of Culture and Arts, and lives and works in Kyiv.

Kyiv Academic Theater "Golden Gate"

Theater "Atelier 16"

Theater 

 The Threepenny Opera by B. Brecht — Peacham Series
 The Glass Menagerie by T. William - Laura
 "Horse's Egg" based on the play "Victor, or Children in Power" by Roger Vitraka - Teresa Mano
 "The one who fell from the sky", children's musical based on Ukrainian folk tales - Bukhanochka
 "The Importance of Being Earnest" O. Wilde - Miss Prism
 “Waiting for Godot (Waiting Men)” by S. Becket — Orchestra
 "Waiting for Godot (Women's Expectations)" S. Becket - Pozzo
 "Romeo and Juliet" by W. Shakespeare - Nurse
 "Suicide" M. Erdman - Serafima Ilyinichna
 2015 - "Feeling behind the wall" by Anna Yablonskaya; dir. Stas Zhirkov
 2015 - "Stalkers" by Pavel Arye; dir. Stas Zhirkov - Slavka (co-production of the Golden Gate Theater and the Kiev Academic Young Theater)
 2016 - "Glory to the Heroes" by P. Aryeh; dir. Stas Zhirkov
 2016 - "Fancy toys on the roof" based on "light steps" by Veniamin Kaverin; dir. Dmitry Gusakov
 2017 - "KostyaKatyaMamaTea" by Tamara Trunova; dir. Tetyana Gubriy - Katya's mother
 2017 - "Colors" by Pavel Arye; dir. V. Belozorenko - Violet
 2017 - "Dad, did you love me?" based on the play "The Quiet Rustle of Disappearing Steps" by Dmitry Bogoslavsky; dir. Stas Zhirkov
 2018 - "Miss Julia" by August Strindberg; dir. Ivan Uryvsky - Freken Julia
 2019 - "Take everything from life" by Ruslan Gorovoy and daddy Bo; dir. Tetyana Hubriy
 2020 - "The family of the pathologist Lyudmila" Pavel Arye; dir. Elena Apchel
 2021, March 13 - solo performance "The Squirrel Who Lived 100 Years" by Oleg Mikhailov; dir. Stas Zhirkov

Producer agency "TE-ART" 

 2016 - "Illusions" by Ivan Vyrypaev; dir. Stas Zhirkov
 2017 — Chaos. Women on the Verge of a Nervous Breakdown” Mika Mylluaho; dir. Maxim Golenko
 2020, October 31 "faithful wives" of the Olkhovskaya authorities; dir. Tetyana Hubriy

 Other

 "Don Juan" by Molière; dir. Stanislav Moiseev - Matyurina (Kyiv Academic Young Theatre)
 2015 - "The Cauldron" by Maria Starozhitskaya; dir. Evgeny Stepanenko (multimedia performance at the Kinopanorama cinema)
 2017 - "How to spend a million that does not exist" based on the book "How to spend a million that does not exist and other stories of a Jewish boy" by Garik Korogodsky; dir. Tikhon Tikhomirov (entreprise, Kyiv)
 2019 - "For family reasons" Ray Cooney; dir. Vyacheslav Zhyla (entreprise, Kyiv)
 2019 - "Don Juan" modern mix by Marina Smilyanets; dir. Maxim Golenko (Kiev Academic Theater "Actor")

Filmography 

 2004 - Love is blind - Episode
 2005 - Thanks for everything - Young midwife
 2005 "The myth of the ideal man" Nastya
 2005-2006 - Lesya + Roma (TV series) - episode
 2006 - Return of Mukhtar-3 (85th series "Marquis and Garden") - nanny
 2006 - Nine Lives of Nestor Makhno - episode
 2006 - Grandfather of my dreams 2 - housekeeper
 2006 - Madhouse - episode
 2006 - Beware of blondes! - episode
 2006 - Utiosov, song for life - nurse
 2006-2007 - Guardian Angel (TV series) - Agatha, journalist
 2007 - Harp for the Beloved - Methodist
 2007 - The return of Mukhtar-4 (57th series "Beautiful finale") - Kozlova
 2007 - Money for daughter - Valentina
 2007 - Sign of Destiny - episode
 2007 - Forgiveness Sunday - Lyudka
 2007-2011 - In search of truth
 2008 - My daughter
 2008 - Red Lotus - Zhanna, Dmitry's wife
 2008 - Blue as sea eyes - Timur's wife
 2008 - Maid of the Three Masters - Natasha
 2008 - Mysterious Island - Vachterka
 2009 - Ice in the coffee grounds - actress
 2009 - Shark - Valya, a nurse in a special reception
 2009 - Prodigal children - Lyudmila Nikolaevna, teacher
 2009 - The return of Mukhtar-5 (48th series "Money does not smell") - an employee of the currency exchange
 2009 - Legends of witch love - episode
 2009 - Melody for Katerina - engraving on the machine
 2009 - Assholes. Arabesque
 2009 - Windows - pharmacy clerk
 2009 - Autumn Flowers - Wiring
 2009 - According to the law - Ant (21st series "Death of the Jubilee") - Murashkin
 2009 Abduction of the Goddess - Makeup
 2009 - Matchmakers-2 (TV series) - florist
 2009 - Life of Captain Chernyaev - episode (uncredited)
 2009 - Without trial or investigation
 2009 Dead End
 2010 — Faith. Hope. Love - Valya, nurse
 2010 - The war ended yesterday - Manka
 2010 - Neighbors - Masha, daughter of Radmila
 2010 - Smile when the stars cry
 2010 - finished
 2011 - Indian summer - milkmaid
 2011 - The Ballad of the Bomber - episode
 2011 - Grandfather - cashier
 2011 - House with a tower - curly woman
 2011 - Return of Mukhtar-7 (55th series "Under the Hat") - Olga Nikolaevna Murzintseva, Petrushkina's housekeeper
 2011 - Donut Luca - country girl (uncredited)
 2011 - Casanova's last case - Pavlova, lieutenant of the State Tax Service (uncredited)
 2011 - Seven miles to the sky - Lida, dressmaker
 2011 - Urgently looking for a man - an employee of the Central Address Bureau
 2011 - I will never forget you - Valya, postman
 2012 - Match - episode
 2012 - Tales of Mityai - Anya Ptichnitsa
 2012 - Island of useless people - Vicki, Lisa's friend
 2012 - Ukraine, goodbye! Non-GMO (short)
 2012 General's daughter-in-law - Klava
 2012 - Jamaica - cook in the colony
 2012 - The road to the void - Raisa Andreevna, savings
 2012 - Female Doctor (TV series) - Vita Igorevna Polupanova, head nurse
 2012 - Defender - Tamara, summer resident
 2012 - Waiting list - Varya, nurse
 2012 - I love because I love - Lucy, saleswoman
 2012 - Lover for Lucy - Snow Maiden
 2012 - Love with a weapon - Inna, psychologist
 2012 - Dumb - Masha
 2012 - Odesa-mother - Angela, Arnold's wife
 2012 - Flight of the Butterfly - Maid
 2012 - Gunpowder and Fraction (Film 6 "Gray Mouse") - Nurse
 2012 - Rollfield
 2013 - Passion for Chapai - episode
 2013 - Double life - nurse
 2013 - Steward - Belka, florist
 2013 - Female doctor-2 (TV series) - Vita Igorevna Polupanova, senior midwife
 2013 - Love with a trial period - Lisa, librarian
 2013 - Butterflies (mini-series) - Nina, paramedic
 2013 - Lonely Hearts - Irina
 2013 - Divorce of neighbors - Tanechka
 2013 - Vacation for living - Oksana, Ulyana's friend
 2013 - Chief of Police - Zina
 2013 - Schuler - Kurybko, leader
 2013 - I will always wait for you - Dusy
 2014 — Botman Seagull
 2014 - Poddubny - sister of Ivan Poddubny
 2014 - Brotherhood - Tanya, nurse
 2014 - Everything will return - registry office worker
 2014 - Let's kiss - stranger
 2014 - Farewell, boys - Masha, Zaitsev's wife
 2014 - Beach - Zoya, Pie Saleswoman
 2014 - Sing in a moment - Olechka, nurse
 2014 - While the village sleeps - Baba-1
 2014 - Charlie - Nurse
 2015 - Come back - Let's talk - cashier
 2015 - Officers' wives - Glasha
 2015 - Song of Songs - Shimek's mother
 2015 - Servant of the people (TV series) - Mila, Skoryk's wife
 2015 - This is love - toastmaster
 2015 — Poor People
 2016 - Welcome to the Canarian Service - Dear Nurse
 2016 — Nikonov & Co — Larisa Novikova
 2016 - Express business trip - Tanya
 2016 - On the line of life - Yana, nurse
 2016 — Pushers — Irina Marusheva
 2016 - Presenter (TV series) - Valya, leading car restaurant
 2016 - Central Hospital - Vera Nachalova, wife of Vladimir
 2017 - Upside down
 2017 - The second life of Eva - Tatyana
 2017 - Female Doctor - 3 (TV series) - Vita Igorevna Polupanova, Kvitko's wife
 2017 - Line of Light - Tamara
 2017 - Dawn will come - Margarita Petrovna Stepanova (Queen Margot), matron
 2017 - Servant of the people - 2. From love to impeachment (TV series) - Mila, Skorik's wife
 2017 — Specialists — Council, Secretary
 2017 — Know our
 2017 - First night - Faina Zakharovna (short)
 2018 - Two poles of love ("Two banks of the road") - Zinaida Kurbatova, Fedor's wife, mother of twins
 2018 - Two mothers (TV series) - Galina Poltorak, mother of Zoya and Sergey
 2018 — Zainka (short)
 2018 - A year in debt! - episode
 2018 - House for happiness - Lyuba
 2018 - Gate - Glory, daughter of Baba Prisi
 2019 - 11 children from Morshyn - cleaning lady in the shopping center
 2019 - Someone else's life (TV series) - episode
 2019 - Routes of Destiny
 2019 - Cherkasy - mother Mouse
 2019 - House for happiness - 2 - Lyuba
 2019 - Female Doctor-4 (TV series) - Vita Igorevna Polupanova, Kvitko's wife
 2019 — Meeting of classmates — Irka
 2019 - Family for a year - Shirma Svetlana Yurievna, OPEC officer
 2019 - Survive at any cost (TV series) - Galina Fedorovna, mother-in-law
 2019 — Medfak
 2020 - Papanki-2 - head of condominiums
 2020 - Female doctor - 5 (TV series) - Vita Igorovna Polupanova, flower girl
 2020 - Suffer a little
 2021 - Dead Lilies - Galina
 2021 - Amber Cops
 2021 - Lusya Intern - Nina Rozhok
 2021 - House of happiness. Bourbon Time - Luba
 2021 - Doctor Hope
 2022 - House for happiness - 3 - Lyuba
 2022 - Bobrinsky House - Olga Nikolaevna Onufrieva
 2022 — Hope

Dubbing and voice acting 

 1950 - Cinderella - Drisella
 2015 - Thoughts inside out - Sadness
 2015 - The Perfect Voice 2 - (Bella) Cow (Fat) Amy (Patricia) (played by Rebel Wilson)
 2016 - Actively Seeking - Robin, co-writer of Alice (played by Rebel Wilson)
 2019 - Desperate Rascals - Lonnie (performed by Rebel Wilson)
 2019 - Cats - Geniashvendi (played by Rebel Wilson)
 2020 - Sonic - Sonic the Hedgehog

Awards and nominations 

 2016 - Nomination for the theater award "Kyiv Pectoral" in the nomination "Best production of a supporting actress" for her role in the play "Stalkers"
 2019 - Victory in the IV Theater Award "Mirror of the Stage" (newspaper "Mirror of the Week. Ukraine") in the nomination "Acting Charisma" for her role in the play "Miss Julia", theater "Golden Gate"
 2019 - National Film Award "Golden Dziga". Golden Dziga Award for Best Supporting Actress (the role of Slavka in The Gates)
 2020 - Honored Artist of Ukraine.

References 

Recipients of the title of Merited Artist of Ukraine
21st-century actresses
Ukrainian actresses
Living people
1980 births